is a passenger railway station located in the town of Kami, Mikata District, Hyōgo, Japan, operated by West Japan Railway Company (JR West).

Lines

Station layout
The station consists of one ground-level side platform serving a single bi-directional track. The station is unattended.

Adjacent stations

History
Shibayama Station opened within Kuchisazu village on June 26, 1947. A second platform was opened on October 1, 1965. Freight operations were discontinued in 1971 and luggage handing in 1984. The station became unmanned on October 1, 1984. With the privatization of the Japan National Railways (JNR) on April 1, 1987, the station came under the aegis of the West Japan Railway Company. Platform 1 was closed on March 3, 2001 and the station building was demolished in November 2018, with present concrete structure completed in January 2020.

Passenger statistics
In fiscal 2016, the station was used by an average of 89 passengers daily

Surrounding area
 Shibayama fishing port
 Shibayama onsen

See also
List of railway stations in Japan

References

External links

 Station Official Site

Railway stations in Hyōgo Prefecture
Sanin Main Line
Railway stations in Japan opened in 1947
Kami, Hyōgo (Mikata)